Hatfield is a small hamlet in  the district  of Wychavon near the city  of Worcester, in  England. It  is surrounded by the  villages of Littleworth, Norton, Pirton & Kempsey.

A regular bus service operates through the nearby village of Littleworth, allowing riders to travel west into Worcester or east into Pershore. The village is close to junction 7 of the M5 motorway.

A  Norton-Juxta-Kempsey Church of England First School is located in the bordering village of Littleworth. Places of social interest near Hatfield include the two country pubs which sit between it,  'The Inn' along 'Stonehall Common and 'The Retreat' on the outskirts of Littleworth. Littleworth possess a typical 'Parish Hall', home to children's playgroup sessions and various evening/weekend clubs.

External links

 Wychavon  District  Council -  Hatfield

Hamlets in Worcestershire